Shall Come a Time is a novel by F. J. Thwaites.

References

External links
Shall Come a Time at AustLit

1967 Australian novels